Pseudonoba is a genus of sea snails, marine gastropod mollusks in the family Iravadiidae.

Species
Species within the genus Pseudonoba include:
 Pseudonoba aristaei (Melvill, 1912)
 Pseudonoba atemeles (Melvill, 1896)
 Pseudonoba delicata (Philippi, 1849)
 Pseudonoba expansilabrum (Ponder, 1984)
 Pseudonoba gemmata (Ponder, 1984)
 Pseudonoba ictriella (Melvill, 1910)
 Pseudonoba inflata (Ponder, 1967)
 Pseudonoba padangensis (Thiele, 1925)
 † Pseudonoba peculiaris O. Boettger, 1902 
 † Pseudonoba ponderi (Kiel, 2003) 
 Pseudonoba profundior (Ponder, 1984)
 Pseudonoba sublevis (Laseron, 1956)
 Pseudonoba subquadrata (Laseron, 1950)
 † Pseudonoba tarbelliana Lozouet, 1998 
 Pseudonoba yendoi (Yokoyama, 1927)

References

 Boettger, O. 1902. Zur Kenntnis der Fauna der Mittelmiocänen Schichten von Kostej im Krassó-Szörénver Komitat. Verhandlungen und Mitteilungen des Siebenbürgischen vereins für Naturwissenschaften zu Hermannstadt 51:1-200

External links

Iravadiidae